Tonyosynthemis claviculata, commonly known as the clavicle tigertail, is a species of dragonfly.
They are found in Queensland, Australia, along streams and rivers, or near the eastern Australian coast and drainage basins.

Body
The hindwing of an average adult is generally 30 mm or larger.

Male
One of the specimens that scientist Günther Theischinger collected and studied was male of medium length. The majority of its body was colored black, with some yellow patterns. Unlike the rest of its body, the bases of its wings (also known as subcostal space) were not black in color. The abdomen and tergum of the specimen was without a distal hair-brush, but had small, short hairs. The upper majority of the male's anal appendages were club-shaped and curved.

Female
Another of the specimens that Theischinger collected was female and of medium length. The majority of its body was colored black, with some yellow patterns. Unlike the rest of its body, the bases of its wings were not black in color. The abdomen and tergum of the specimen was without distal hair-brush, but had small, short hairs. The female's genital valves were narrow in measure, with a developed styli and a laterodistal point.

Larvae
One of the smaller specimens that Theischinger collected was a larva of average length. The body measured about 19 mm, its prementum was of a fair width and its ligula and median lobe still were in the process of development. The specimen's labial palps were still relatively small, but also had six large palpal setae, and its postocular lobe was rather bilobed. The larvae's pronotal lobe was well developed and included short setae, while its abdomen had obtuse laterodorsal on five segments.

Gallery

References

Synthemistidae
Odonata of Australia
Endemic fauna of Australia
Taxa named by Robert John Tillyard
Insects described in 1909